Black is a 2015 Belgian crime film written and directed by Adil El Arbi and Bilall Fallah, based on the books Black and Back by Dirk Bracke. The film is centered around two young gangsters who seek love, but are impeded by the rivalry between their gang allegiances.

The plot line is influenced by William Shakespeare's Romeo and Juliet and Arthur Laurent's West Side Story but relocates the story to street gangs in modern day Brussels, Belgium. It premiered at the 2015 Toronto International Film Festival, where it was screened in the Discovery section.

Plot
Mavela falls in love with Marwan, member of a rival gang. However, her affair with the Moroccan is an intolerable act in the eyes of both gangs, prompting the relationship to stay secret or else be plunged into a brutal war between their rival gangs.

Cast
 Martha Canga Antonio as Mavela
 Aboubakr Bensaihi as Marwan
 Soufiane Chilah as Nassim
 Marine Scandiuzzi as Sindi
 Simon Frey as Jonathan
 Sanaa Bourrasse as Loubna
 Emmanuel Tahon as X
 Théo Kabeya as Notorious
 Natascha Boyamba as Justelle
 Jérémie Zagba as Don
 Ashley Ntangu as Doris
 Eric Kabongo as Krazy-E

Accolades

Streetcasting
To amplify the harshness and roughness, they chose to work with unknown actors and actresses. Hence the term streetcasting, most of them were picked right off the streets. In cooperation with the casting agency Hakuna Casting, Nabil Mallat and Chafic Amraoui visited Brussels' migrant neighborhoods looking for new talent. Caroline Bastin coached the newfound actors during the auditions. Because of the unique background of the cast, these talents were able to give the film's narrative a special touch.

References

External links
 

2015 films
2015 crime films
Belgian crime films
2010s French-language films
2010s Arabic-language films
2010s Dutch-language films
Films based on multiple works of a series
Films directed by Adil El Arbi and Bilall Fallah
Films set in Brussels
Films shot in Brussels
2015 multilingual films
Belgian multilingual films